The Aero A.35 was a Czechoslovakian airliner of the 1920s and 1930s. Designed by Aero for long-range flight, with a transatlantic crossing in mind, it saw service with CSA although no such crossing was ever attempted. A conventional high-wing monoplane, it was a very modern design for its day in all but one respect – the cockpit still had open sides. An extra passenger could also be accommodated here, beside the pilot.

Operational history

Two A.35s were sold to an industrial company, and were among the earliest aircraft purchased as corporate transports.

In June 1933, Czech Airlines flew the A.35 from the port town of Sušak (the former name for Rijeka). The aircraft was named the “Adriatic Express”.

Operators

Czech Airlines

Yugoslav Royal Air Force - One aircraft was impressed into military service in April 1940.

Specifications (A.35)

References

1920s Czechoslovakian airliners
A035
Single-engined tractor aircraft
High-wing aircraft